Nature worship also called naturism or physiolatry is any of a variety of religious, spiritual and devotional practices that focus on the worship of the nature spirits considered to be behind the natural phenomena visible throughout nature. A nature deity can be in charge of nature, a place, a biotope, the biosphere, the cosmos, or the universe. Nature worship is often considered the primitive source of modern religious beliefs and can be found in pantheism, panentheism, deism, polytheism, animism, totemism, shamanism, some theism and paganism including Wicca. Common to most forms of nature worship is a spiritual focus on the individual's connection and influence on some aspects of the natural world and reverence towards it. Due to their admiration of nature, the works of Edmund Spenser, Anthony Ashley-Cooper and Carl Linnaeus were viewed as nature worship.

Forms and aspects of nature worship 

 Animal worship
 Fire worship
 Gaia philosophy
 Gavari
 Green Man
 Holy well
 Megalith
 Mountain worship
 Naturalistic pantheism
 Naturalistic spirituality
 Sacred groves
 Sacred herbs
 Sacred mountains
 Sky deity
 Standing stone
 Star worship
 Stone circle
 Thunder god
 Totem
 Tree worship
 Water deity

See also

 Earth religion
 Faunus 
 Folk religion
 Goddess worship (disambiguation)
 Natural religion
 Neopaganism
 Pan
 Pantheism
 Panentheism
 Shamanism
 White magic
 Wildlife totemization

References

 
Spirituality